Belveglio is a comune (municipality) in the Province of Asti in the Italian region Piedmont, located about  southeast of Turin and about  southeast of Asti.  
Belveglio borders the following municipalities: Cortiglione, Mombercelli, Rocchetta Tanaro, and Vinchio.

References

Cities and towns in Piedmont